Apocalypse in Lilac, Capriccio is a 1945 gouache painting by the Russian-born artist Marc Chagall. The 20-inch by 14-inch work was created by Chagall in response to the devastation brought by the Holocaust; its imagery consists of a crucified Jesus Christ screaming at a Nazi storm trooper while other acts of violence – another crucifixion, a man being hanged and an adult male stabbing a child – can be seen in the background while an inverted clock falls out of the sky.

Overview
Chagall kept the painting in his personal collection. It was initially sold by the artist's son in 1985 to a private collector in France. In October 2009, it was purchased by the Ben Uri Gallery & Museum for US$43,000, despite estimates after the historical context correctly understood and researched by Ben Uri was released and recognised by the international community  that it could be worth more than $1.5 million, and was publicly displayed for the first time in January 2010.

See also
List of artworks by Marc Chagall

References

External links
Apocalypse en Lilas, Capriccio at the Ben Uri Gallery

1945 paintings
Paintings by Marc Chagall
Paintings depicting the Crucifixion of Jesus